Air charter is the business of renting an aircraft.

Air Charter may also refer to:
Air Charter (game), a board game
Air Charter International, a defunct French airline
Air Charter Limited, a defunct British airline